Michael Murray Grant (born July 16, 1951, in Hutchinson, Kansas) is an attorney and former host of the long-running Arizona Public Television program Horizon.  Before his work on Horizon, Grant worked in Arizona radio both as a disc jockey and an investigative reporter, most notably for KOY-AM.

Grant got his start on Arizona television by covering Sandra Day O'Connor's Senate confirmation hearings for KAET Channel 8 and PBS.  After the hearings, KAET producers came to Grant with a concept for a daily discussion show.  The special Friday edition was to be modeled after Washington Week in Review.  Known as the roundtable discussion, local journalists would review the week's top news stories in an informal, conversational format.  Monday through Thursday's shows would focus on interviews with subjects close to a particular newsworthy event or issue.

Grant was with Horizon for over a quarter century and hosted the 25th anniversary edition of the show on October 19, 2006. Grant hosted his last Horizon show as the regular moderator on January 26, 2007, although he has since acted as a fill-in host on a few occasions.

Grant received his bachelor's degree in English from Arizona State University in 1973 and his Juris Doctor from ASU in 1976.  He currently practices telecommunications and public utility law at Gallagher and Kennedy, PA, in Phoenix.

External links
Horizon information page at PBS's Arizona website
Article: Award-winning 'HORIZON' celebrates 25 years
Article: 'Horizon' host marks 25 years of talking politics

1951 births
Living people
People from Hutchinson, Kansas
Arizona State University alumni
Arizona lawyers
American television hosts
Sandra Day O'Connor College of Law alumni